Kenule Beeson Saro-Wiwa Polytechnic (formerly Rivers State Polytechnic) is a tertiary learning institution in Bori City, Khana Local Government Area in Rivers State, Nigeria. It has two campuses, one for the School of Management Sciences and the other for the School of Engineering.
It is approved as a state-owned polytechnic by the National Board for Technical Education. Engr. Dr. Ledum Suanu Gwarah is the current Rector of the polytechnic.

History
The polytechnic was established by the Rivers State Government on 13 May 1988. to provide instruction and research in applied science, technology, commerce and business management. 
The Military Governor, Anthony Ukpo, inaugurated the provisional council and his successor, Group Captain Ernest Adeleye signed the edict establishing the Polytechnic  on 25 March 1989 and performed the formal ceremony of the institution on 19 May 1990.

In 2009 Senator Lee Ledogo Maeba noted that in 2007 he had obtained approval in principle from the Federal Government to upgrade the polytechnic to a Federal institution, but that the state government had yet to follow up on the opportunity.

In August 2009 the acting provost spoke of the problem with cultism among students, and possibly instructors, and described the decisive actions that the polytechnic was taking to combat it.
Talking in November 2009 about efforts to clean up the environment from contamination by oil exploitation, Rivers State Governor Rotimi Amaechi said that educational institutes including the polytechnic would assist in ensuring the success of the program.

In January 2010 the polytechnic introduced a National Diploma course in Mass Communication, for aspiring journalists.

Academic programmes

The Institution has 4 Schools (faculties) and they offer Academic courses for National Diploma (ND) and Higher National Diploma Degree (HND)

Schools and department
1. School of Applied Sciences
School of Applied Sciences:

 Computer Science 
 Science Laboratory Technology – ND
 Statistics 
 Science Laboratory Technology (SLT)

Science Laboratory Technology HND options

 Biology
 Microbiology
 Chemistry
 Biochemistry
 Physics/Electronics

2. School of Engineering
 Civil Engineering 
 Architectural engineering
 Electrical/Electronic Engineering – ND
 Electrical/Electronic Engineering
Electrical/Electronic Engineering HND Options

 Telecommunication and Electronics
 Power and Machine
 Mechanical Engineering – ND
Mechanical Engineering – HND options
 Manufacturing
 Power plant

3. School of Environmental Technology
 Estate Management 
 Urban and Regional Planning
 Industrial Safety and Environmental engineering Technology

4. School of Management Sciences
 Accountancy 
 Banking and Finance 
 Business Administration & Management 
 Marketing
 Office Technology and Management (OTM) 
 Insurance
 Mass Communication 
 Public Administration

Notable alumni

See also
List of polytechnics in Nigeria
Education in Nigeria

References

Polytechnics in Nigeria
Universities and colleges in Rivers State
Educational institutions established in 1992
Public universities in Nigeria
1992 establishments in Nigeria